Luca Fusco (born 31 August 1977) is an Italian professional football manager and former player.

Fusco played over 200 matches at Serie B and 31 at Serie A. He had spent over 7 season at native club Salernitana.

Career
Started his career at Salernitana, he started to play for first team in January 1998 after a loan spell at Serie D club Cavese. He won the 2nd division champion with Salernitana at the end of season. His first taste of Italian top division started on 13 September 1998, the opening match that lost 1–3 to A.S. Roma. His journey at Serie A paused at 24 games, due to the relegation of the Campania team. He played for the club at Serie B until 2003, which he was signed by league rival Messina. He played 42 out of possible 46 league matches, and followed the team promoted to Serie A again, this time as 4th place. But before he joined Genoa of Serie C1 in January 2006, he just played 7 Serie A matches in the previous  Serie A seasons, partially due to injuries. After won the Serie B promotion with Geona, again, he was not in the plan of Genoa, which originally promoted Serie A in 2005 but suffered from its scandal. He was loaned to Crotone but faced relegation again.

In August 2007, Fusco re-joined Salernitana, which relegated to Serie C1 since 2005. Fusco regained his fit as a regular starter, won the promotion with club as champion in 2008, and avoided relegation by finished at 14th, just one point away from the relegated team.

He became a free agent after Salernitana relegated. On 2 November 2010 he joined Paganese.

Coaching career
He was appointed head coach of Paganese in Serie C on 13 July 2018. He was fired by Paganese on 13 November 2018, with the team in the relegation zone.

Honours
Serie B Champion: 1998
Serie C1 Champion: 2008
Serie D Champion: 1997
Serie C1 Promotion Playoffs Winner: 2006

References

External links
http://aic.football.it/scheda/1775/fusco-luca.htm

Italian footballers
U.S. Salernitana 1919 players
Cavese 1919 players
A.C.R. Messina players
Genoa C.F.C. players
F.C. Crotone players
Serie A players
Association football defenders
People from Salerno
1977 births
Living people
Italian football managers
Footballers from Campania
Sportspeople from the Province of Salerno
20th-century Italian people
21st-century Italian people